Trundle is a small town in Parkes Shire in the Central West of New South Wales, Australia.

It lies in wheat-growing country and is on the Bogan Gate–Tottenham railway line, completed to Trundle in 1907.

History
Trundle lay on the southern boundary of the Wangaibon people's traditional lands.

Trundle Lagoon Post Office opened on 1 May 1889 and was renamed Trundle in 1892.

The (NSW) Geographical Names Board's only record of the origin of the name is a State Rail Authority's archives document on station names which indicates that the name probably originated from Trundle (hill-fort), about 24 km northeast of Portsmouth, England. ['Trundle' is an old English word for 'circle'.] 

The archives document also said that it was the name of William Cumming's leased runs in 1859, which he called Trundle Lagoon; that the 1866 Gazetteer recorded that Trundle Lagoon was occupied by George and John Palmer; and that the school opened as Trundle Lagoon in 1883, then Trundle in 1885.

Hotel

The Trundle Hotel was opened 17 March 1912, replacing an earlier 1888 building. The hotel was designed with long halls and corridors to allow cool draughts to flow through the building. The building was constructed by A.E.Ware for 5,000 pounds ($10,000). The hotel claims the second longest hotel balcony (with 68 metres facing Forbes St and 18 metres facing Parkes St), in New South Wales. (The longest hotel balcony in New South Wales is in Cobar, at 91 metres.)

Today
The town is noted for having one of the widest main streets in the country, at 60 metres. It was built as wide as this to accommodate turning bullock trains.

Health services are provided through the Trundle multi-purpose health centre (formerly the Trundle hospital).

There is also a golf course with sand-oil greens, a 25-metre swimming pool, tennis courts, horse-racing facilities and a sporting oval named Berryman Park.

In 2011, Trundle took part in Country Town Rescue for the ABC. Old farmhouses were rented out for a dollar per week to encourage new residents to the town. A TV documentary about the scheme was broadcast on 27 March 2012.

Berry Memorial Church 
The Berry Memorial Church was opened and dedicated on Saturday 25th March 1939. The church was a gift of Mrs Walter Berry in memory of her husband and to commemorate the arrival of the Berry's in 1887. The church’s architect was Hedley Norman Carr and was built by J. Fullerton. The church is now part of the Uniting Church of Australia.

Bush Tucker Day 
The town's annual festival called "Bush Tucker Day" is held every September, when Trundle's small population is usually increased 2 to 3 fold. The main event is a bush tucker cook off, where contestants strive to make the best tasting bush food. A panel of judges decides the winner. Other competitions during the day include damper throwing, billy boiling and dog jumping, and there are also bush stalls to browse through. Bush music is a major part of the day.

Trundle ABBA Festival 
In 2012, in the tradition of the Parkes Elvis Festival, Trundle launched its own tribute with the inaugural Trundle ABBA Festival  (Australia's first dedicated ABBA festival), which was held in the main street of Trundle, Trundle Memorial Hall, Trundle Hotel and Trundle Services Club in Forbes St, Trundle.
 
In 2013, it won Event of the Year 2013 honors at the Parkes Shire Australia Day Awards, and features in the ABC Documentary ABBA: Bang A Boomerang.

Schools
 Trundle Central School
 St Patrick's Primary school

References

External links

Towns in New South Wales
Towns in the Central West (New South Wales)
Parkes Shire